Monroe is a city in Jasper and Marion counties in Iowa, United States. The population was 1,967 at the time of the 2020 census.

History
Monroe was laid out in 1851 by Adam Tool and was originally called Tool's Point. The name was soon changed to Monroe."Tool's point" is now the name of a park located in the city.

Geography
Monroe's longitude and latitude coordinates in decimal form are 41.521880, -93.103492.

Demographics

2010 census
As of the census of 2010, there were 1,830 people, 770 households, and 527 families living in the city. The racial makeup of the city was 98.7% White, 0.3% African American, 0.1% Native American, 0.5% Asian, 0.1% from other races, and 0.3% from two or more races. Hispanic or Latino of any race were 0.6% of the population.

There were 770 households, of which 31.8% had children under the age of 18 living with them, 55.8% were married couples living together, 7.4% had a female householder with no husband present, 5.2% had a male householder with no wife present, and 31.6% were non-families. 26.6% of all households were made up of individuals, and 10.8% had someone living alone who was 65 years of age or older. The average household size was 2.38 and the average family size was 2.87.

The median age in the city was 38.6 years. 24.4% of residents were under the age of 18; 7.7% were between the ages of 18 and 24; 26.4% were from 25 to 44; 25.5% were from 45 to 64; and 16.2% were 65 years of age or older. The gender makeup of the city was 49.9% male and 50.1% female.

2000 census
As of the census of 2000, there were 1,808 people, 753 households, and 521 families living in the city. The racial makeup of the city was 98.12% White, 0.17% African American, 0.22% Native American, 0.44% Asian, 0.33% from other races, and 0.72% from two or more races. Hispanic or Latino of any race were 0.77% of the population.

There were 753 households, out of which 33.1% had children under the age of 18 living with them, 57.6% were married couples living together, 8.2% had a female householder with no husband present, and 30.7% were non-families. 27.1% of all households were made up of individuals, and 12.9% had someone living alone who was 65 years of age or older. The average household size was 2.40 and the average family size was 2.91.

26.3% are under the age of 18, 8.3% from 18 to 24, 27.4% from 25 to 44, 23.5% from 45 to 64, and 14.5% who were 65 years of age or older. The median age was 37 years. For every 100 females, there were 92.5 males. For every 100 females age 18 and over, there were 87.3 males.

The median income for a household in the city was $39,837, and the median income for a family was $50,819. Males had a median income of $33,679 versus $25,256 for females. The per capita income for the city was $18,518. About 3.1% of families and 5.6% of the population were below the poverty line, including 4.9% of those under age 18 and 7.8% of those age 65 or over.

Education
The PCM Community School District operates public schools serving the community. It was a part of the Monroe School District, known prior to July 1, 1978 as the New Monroe school district, until it merged with the Prairie City district into PCM on July 1, 1991. Monroe is home to Monroe Elementary School and PCM Community High School while the middle school is in Prairie City.

Notable people

Bucky O'Connor (1913–1958), head coach of the Iowa Hawkeyes men's basketball team from 1949 to 1958 
Bonnie Lucas (1956-), radio personality

See also

Elk Rock State Park
Iowa Highway 14
Iowa Highway 163

References

External links

Monroe Portal style website, Government, Businesses, and more
City-Data Comprehensive Statistical Data and more about Monroe

Cities in Iowa
Cities in Jasper County, Iowa
1851 establishments in Iowa
Populated places established in 1851